The 2016 Kjærgaard Danish FIM Speedway Grand Prix was the third race of the 2016 Speedway Grand Prix season. It took place on June 11th at the CASA Arena in Horsens, Denmark.

Riders 
For the third successive Grand Prix first reserve Fredrik Lindgren replaced Jarosław Hampel, who had injured himself during the 2015 Speedway World Cup and was not fit to compete. The Speedway Grand Prix Commission also nominated Anders Thomsen as the wild card, and Mikkel Bech and Mikkel Michelsen both as Track Reserves.

Results 
The Grand Prix was won by Maciej Janowski, who beat Chris Holder, Tai Woffinden and Nicki Pedersen in the final. Greg Hancock had top stored during the 20 qualifying heats, but was eliminated in the semi-finals after making a mistake. Despite finishing third, Woffinden joined Holder at the top of the standings on 39 points after outscoring his rival on the evening.

Heat details

The intermediate classification

References

See also 
 motorcycle speedway

Denmark
Speedway Grand Prix
Speedway Grand Prix of Denmark